Peak gas is the year in which the maximum global natural gas (fossil gas) production rate will be reached, after which the rate of production will enter its terminal decline.  Although demand is peaking in the United States and Europe, it continues to rise globally due to consumers in Asia, especially China. Natural gas is a fossil fuel formed from plant matter over the course of millions of years.  Natural gas derived from fossil fuels is a non-renewable energy source; however, methane can be renewable in other forms such as biogas. Peak coal was in 2013, and peak oil is forecast to occur before peak gas. One forecast is for natural gas demand to peak in 2035.

The concept of peak gas follows from Hubbert peak theory, which is most commonly associated with peak oil.  Hubbert saw gas, coal and oil as natural resources, each of which would peak in production and eventually run out for a region, a country, or the world.

Gas demand 

The world gets almost one quarter of its energy from natural gas.  The largest increments in future gas demand are expected to come from developing countries.

Gas supply 

Hubbert’s original peak theory predicts that natural gas will experience three equally spaced events: first, the rate of discoveries will peak, then X years later reserves will peak, and finally X years after peak reserves, gas production will peak at the same rate as the previous peak of discoveries.

Of the three peaks, Hubbert found the peak in discoveries most difficult to define, because of large year-to-year scatter, and the phenomenon of “reserve growth.” Initial estimates of a discovery are usually much lower than ultimate recovery, especially if the conservative estimate of proven reserves is the measure.  As the discovery is drilled out, estimates rise. Sometimes estimates of recoverable oil and gas in a discovery continue to rise for many years after the discovery. To find the peak in discoveries, Hubbert backdated reserve growth to the date of field discovery.

New gas discoveries 

According to David L. Goodstein, the worldwide rate of discovery peaked around 1960 and has been declining ever since.  Exxon Mobil Vice President, Harry J. Longwell places the peak of global gas discovery around 1970 and has observed a sharp decline in natural gas discovery rates since then.  The rate of discovery has fallen below the rate of consumption in 1980.  The gap has been widening ever since. Declining gas discovery rates foreshadow future production decline rates because gas production can only follow gas discoveries.

Despite the reported fall in new-field discoveries, world proved reserves of natural gas have continued to grow, from 19 billion cubic meters (bcm) in 1960, 45 bcm in 1970 and 84 bcm in 1980, to a record high 200 bcm in 2012. A researcher for the US Energy Information Administration pointed out that after the first wave of discoveries in an area, most oil and natural gas reserve growth comes not from discoveries of new fields, but from extensions and additional gas found within existing fields.

A similar situation exists with oil reserves in that they have increased despite the actual declines of worldwide discoveries for decades and despite increases in consumption. BP’s former Chief Petroleum Engineer Jeremy Gilbert stated in 2007 that the growth in oil reserves "results largely from distortions created by the..reporting rules of the US Securities and Exchange Commission" that force companies to be overly conservative in their calculation of reserves, but that "even this illusory growth is unlikely to last," because fewer oil reserves are coming under the control of SEC-regulated companies. However, since Gilbert's statement, proven reserves of both oil and gas have continued to rise, proven oil reserves increasing 23%, from 1.20 trillion barrels in 2007, to 1.48 trillion barrels in 2012.

Production

Reserves

By country

Italy

Italy's gas consumption is presently third-highest in Europe, behind only Germany and the United Kingdom. Gas consumption is growing at a steady rate, and gas consumption in 2001 was 50% greater than it was in 1990.

Italy’s major oil and gas company is Eni. Formerly state-owned, it was privatized during the 1990s, but the government still retains around one-third of the shares. Natural gas reserves in Italy were 164 billion m3 at the beginning of 2007. Natural gas production in 2005 was 11.5 billion m3, while consumption was 82.6 billion m3. The difference was imported. The primary sources of imported gas are Algeria, Russia and the Netherlands.

Netherlands

The Netherlands government has stated that peak gas occurred in 2007–2008 and the country will have become a net importer of natural gas by 2025.

Romania

Natural gas in Romania was discovered in 1909 in the Sărmăşel area. In 1917, Turda became the first European town lit up with natural gas.  Maximum production of 29.8 billion m3 was achieved in 1976.  Today, gas provides about 40% of the country's energy needs.

Russia

Gazprom, Russia's state-controlled gas monopoly, is a firm which holds 25% of the world's gas reserves.  Gazprom produces the bulk of Russia's gas.

United Kingdom

UK gets its natural gas almost entirely from the North Sea.  The North Sea gas field peaked in 2000 and has been falling quickly since.  Production in 2004 was 12% down from the peak.

United States

Steidle, 1952
In 1952, Dr. Edward Steidle, Dean of the School of Mineral Industries at Pennsylvania State College, predicted that gas production would soon decline significantly from 1952 rates, so that gas would cease to be a significant energy source by 2002, and possibly as early as 1975.

M. King Hubbert
Pratt, in his EUR estimate (p. 96), explicitly included what he called the "phenomenal discovery rate" that the industry was then experiencing in the offshore Gulf of Mexico.

In 1962, Hubbert pushed his predicted peak back a few years based on a more optimistic estimation of 1,000 trillion cubic feet of total original reserves. His new peak gas curve predicted a peak in 1978 at slightly more than 20 tcf per year.

But even greater new discoveries in the offshore Gulf of Mexico than anticipated, and development of "unconventional reserves", proved Pratt's EUR estimate to be too low as US gas production rose again.

In 1971, Hubbert revised his peak gas estimate based on updated reserve information. Gas production for the lower 48 states did peak in 1979, and declined for several years, but rose again, and once more Hubbert's assumed EUR of  proved to be too low, as actual lower 48 state production from 1936 through 2012 has already exceeded , 18%  higher than the estimated EUR of 1,075.

Recent US peak predictions
Economist Doug Reynolds predicted in 2005 that the North American gas peak would occur in 2007 Reynolds revised his forecast in 2009 to include Southern Canada; he predicted that the combined US Lower 48-Southern Canadian gas production would peak in 2013.

Although Hubbert had acknowledged multiple peaks in oil production in Illinois, he used single peak models for oil and gas production in the US as a whole.  In 2008, Tad Patzek of the University of California rejected the single-peak model, and showed the multiple peaks of past US gas production as the sum of five different Hubbert curves.  He concluded that new technology has more than doubled gas reserves.  His figure 15 shows gas production declining steeply after a probable peak in known cycles in 2008.  However, he refrained from predicting a date after which gas production would begin terminal decline, but noted: "The actual future of US natural gas production will be the sum of known Hubbert cycles, shown in this paper, and future Hubbert cycles." and warned: "The current drilling effort in the US cannot be sustained without major new advances to increase the productivity of tight formations."

In 2005 Exxon's CEO Lee Raymond said to Reuters that "Gas production has peaked in North America." The Reuters article continues to say "While the number of U.S. rigs drilling for natural gas has climbed about 20 percent over the last year and prices are at record highs, producers have been struggling to raise output."

These represent productions of average annual growth rates between −0.63% (net decline) and 0.85% in the alternate cases, and 0.46% in the reference case.

North American natural gas crisis, 2000–2008

The natural gas crisis is typically described by upward price spikes of natural gas in North America from 2000 to 2008, due to the decline in production and the increase in demand for electricity generation.

The anticipated gas shortage in North America led some, such as former Federal Reserve Chairman Alan Greenspan, to advocate increased imports of liquefied natural gas (LNG). However, record high natural gas production rates and proved reserves in the US have put LNG imports on hold, and even spawned projects for LNG exports from North America. As of April 2015, ten LNG export terminals had been approved and six are under construction in the US and Canada.

Estimates of total reserve base
The large increase over previous years' estimates was attributed to a surge in natural gas drilling and exploration spurred by a rise in prices and new technology allowing production from once uneconomic formations, such as shale and coal seams.

World peak gas 
In 2002, R.W. Bentley (p. 189) predicted a global "decline in conventional gas production from about 2020."

One forecast is for natural gas demand to peak in 2035.

In their March 2013 report, "Fossil and Nuclear Fuels – The Supply Outlook", the Energy Watch Group predicted that global natural gas production "will peak around or even before the year 2020". However, the same report (page 75) postulated that US natural gas production had peaked in 2012, and predicted that it would decline steeply after 2015. Instead, US gas production has continued to rise through 2017.

See also 
2004 Argentine energy crisis – an example of the effects of a gas shortage
Hubbert peak theory
Methane, the principal constituent of natural gas.

Resource peaks
 Peak coal
 Peak copper
 Peak food
 Peak oil
 Peak soil
 Peak uranium
 Peak water
 Peak wheat

References

External links 
 

Energy and the environment
Natural gas
gas